Liscard is an area of the town of Wallasey, in the Metropolitan Borough of Wirral, Merseyside, England. The most centrally located of Wallasey's townships, it is the main shopping area of the town, with many shops located in the Cherry Tree Shopping Centre. At the 2001 census the population of Liscard local government ward was recorded at 14,301, increasing to 15,574 at the 2011 census.

History
The first mention of the settlement was circa 1260 as Lisnekarke. The name is from Welsh Llys carreg, with the name meaning "hall at the rock" or "...cliff". 
In the past the name has been spelt as Liscak (1260), Lisecair (c.1277), Lysenker (1295) and Lyscart (1417).

During the nineteenth century Liscard was a township within Wallasey parish of the Wirral Hundred. It became a civil parish in 1866, ultimately being absorbed into the nascent County Borough of Wallasey in 1912. The population was recorded as 211 in 1801, 4,100 in 1851 and 28,661 in 1901.

Liscard Hall was built in 1835 by a Liverpool merchant, Sir John Tobin. Its grounds later became Central Park. A "model farm" was also developed nearby by the Tobin family. The former Grade II listed mansion later became an art college within Central Park. It was damaged by a suspicious fire on 7 July 2008 after being left empty and inadequately secured by Wirral Council and was subsequently demolished.
The site has since been grassed over.

Liscard Battery was built in 1858 to help protect shipping on the River Mersey and defend the port of Liverpool. It was equipped with seven 10-inch guns. Set back from the river and hidden by new building, it was known as "the snake in the grass" to local inhabitants. The battery was obsolete by 1912, and sold on and houses were erected on top, and now the site has an odd appearance with only the curtain wall and ornate crenellated gatehouse surviving.
This gateway was designated a Grade II listed building in 1988.

Liscard and Poulton railway station on the Wirral Railway opened to passengers in 1895. Consisting of a single island platform in a cutting, it was part of a branch line with Seacombe railway station as its terminus. This branch closed to passengers in 1960 and to freight in 1963. Its route now forms the approach road to the Kingsway Tunnel.

Geography

Governance

Liscard is part of the Wallasey parliamentary constituency and represented since 1992 by Angela Eagle, a Labour Party MP, who retained her seat in the 2015 general election.

The area is also a local government ward of the Metropolitan Borough of Wirral, taking in the majority of Egremont. The most recent local elections took place on 6 May 2021.

Community
The area is largely residential and contains mainly high-density semi-detached and terraced housing. 
Central Park is now the largest park in Wallasey, It has two areas for young children, with swings, slides and other games, large areas of greenery and a popular walled garden. There is also a cricket ground and a large duck pond. It links Liscard to Poulton and Egremont.

Education
Liscard includes the Oldershaw Academy, a secondary school with specialist status as a Business and Enterprise College and Liscard Primary School.

References

Bibliography

External links

 History of Wallasey

Towns and villages in the Metropolitan Borough of Wirral
Buildings and structures in the Metropolitan Borough of Wirral
Wallasey